Kelso is a suburb of Bathurst, New South Wales, Australia, in the Bathurst Regional Council area.

History
Kelso was the original European settlement in the area. In 1816, the initial settlement of Bathurst was established on the eastern banks of the Macquarie River, in current-day Kelso. The first ten farmers in Kelso were each given ; five were newborn colonials and five were immigrants.

Heritage listings 
Kelso has a number of heritage-listed sites, including:
 71-85 Gilmour Street: Holy Trinity Anglican Church

Sights

Holy Trinity Church was the first inland church in Australia. It was built in 1835 to serve the Anglican parish of Kelso. It was the first Australian church consecrated by a bishop.  The church has a close association with early settlement west of the Great Dividing Range.  The church is surrounded by an historical cemetery, which contains many of the Kelso/Bathurst district's pioneers.

Education
Opening in 1976 and formally known as Kelso High School, the Kelso High Campus makes up the Denison College of Secondary Education along with Bathurst High Campus.

Former station
Kelso previously had a railway station on the Main Western line. It opened on 4 February 1875 and was closed on 6 April 1975. It is now served by coach services.

References

External links 
 Kelso High School

Bathurst, New South Wales
Bathurst Region
Main Western railway line, New South Wales